The World is Round may refer to:

 Spherical Earth, the idea of the world as round shaped
 The World is Round (novel), an 1896 novel by Louise Mack
 The World is Round (play), a play performed in NYC, see Grace McLean
 The World is Round (Rothman), a 1978 science fiction novel by Tony Rothman
 The World is Round (song), a 1965 song by American rhythm and blues singer Rufus Thomas
 The World is Round (Stein), a 1939 children's book by Gertrude Stein

See also
 La terre est ronde (disambiguation)